National Consumer Panel (NCP) is a service provided by a joint venture between the Nielsen company and IRI (formerly SymphonyIRI Group) where members in the USA scan the barcodes on all their purchases with a special barcode reader to read a product's barcode and an app supplying unlisted barcodes such as takeaways and market items. The NCP program was formerly known as the Homescan Consumer Panel before the formation of the joint venture with IRI and the merger of the two companies' existing panels.

The store, price, quantity, and special deals have to be entered manually for the products scanned and the information is transmitted weekly to the company. This information then allows the company to calculate measures such as market penetration, average weight of purchase and loyalty for its manufacturing clients. In return for scanning services, participants earn "rewards points".

Program Details 

The company calls the participants its "panelists" and they represent a "mini USA" in which they track what people buy from where and send it to marketing companies and manufacturing clients. Panelists are requested to scan their data after every shopping trip, including simple purchases such as a candy bar or soda from a vending machine, lottery tickets, fruits and vegetables, gasoline, and anything with a barcode. The scanner records what store the purchase was made at, the price and quantity of each product, as well as the total amount spent at that store.  As of late 2019, scanning can also be done using a smartphone application. 

The data is expected to be transmitted weekly to NCP either directly (by connecting the scanner to a phone line) or by USB connection to the computer where their software is installed. After each transmission, the panelist receives "points" which can be redeemed for prizes in the NCP catalog, which contains several different types of prizes. Points per transmission increase depending on the length of time spent in the panel, bonus points are awarded if no weekly submissions are missed. In addition, NCP periodically runs sweepstakes in which one weekly transmission is considered one entry into the drawing.

Besides price scanning, Nielsen collects data through online surveys matched to panelists based on shopping data, household demographics, and the needs of their current clients. There is an "NCP Connect" option in which NCP requests the panelist to install software onto their home computers to monitor how they use the internet, what they buy, and what they do with their computer. Membership in this section of the panel rewarded with the usual points and sweepstakes entries.

Membership in the program is available through online registration at the NCP website. Acceptance into the program is based on household demographics and the current needs of the company.

External links
 NCP Website
NCP Homescan Barcodes iOS App

Market research organizations